John Butler of Clonamicklon (or of Lismalin), (1305 – 6 January 1330) was born in Arklow, Wicklow, Ireland the youngest son of Edmund Butler, Earl of Carrick and Joan FitzGerald. Once older he moved north from Lismalin and established a junior branch of the family in the Slieveardagh Hills at Clonamicklon, County Tipperary.

Lands
Lismalin (also known as Lismolin) is a townland in the civil parish of the same name. The largest town in the parish is Mullinahone. Immediately to the north lies the civil parish of Ballingarry and immediately to the north of Ballingarry lies the civil parish of Buolick in which the townland of Clonamicklon  is located. The largest town in the parish is Gortnahoe. The townland of Clonamicklon borders the civil parish of Kilcooly to the east. In the townland of Kilcoolyabbey  lies Kilcooly Abbey, close to the border with County Kilkenny. Donagh Carbragh O'Brien, King of Thomond, founded the abbey for Cistercian monks about 1200. John Butler was buried in the abbey. Following the Dissolution of the Monasteries during the English Reformation, the lands were granted to the Earl of Ormond. The lands of this family stretched some fifteen miles between Lismalin on the King’s River to Kilcooly. All four civil parishes lie in the barony of Slievardagh.

Marriage and Children
By his wife Johanna, they had one child together 
 Edmund of Lismalin (1325-1372) who married and had one son

See also
 Butler dynasty

References

John
1330 deaths
Normans in Ireland
14th-century Irish people
Year of birth unknown
Younger sons of earls